Linda "Jamilah" Kolocotronis is an American Muslim writer and former educator in American Islamic schools. Of Greek origin, she converted to Islam at the age of 23, and she has published several Islamic fiction novels as well as her doctoral dissertation. Kolocotronis changed her first name to Jamilah when she became Muslim in 1980.

Biography

Religious conversion
After reading the Quran "looking for mistakes and inconsistencies" she found none and converted to Islam in July 1980 (Ramadan 19, 1400), and changed her name to Jamilah. 

Death

Kolocotronis passed away on Saturday January 12, 2013.

Books
Kolocotronis’ first book published in 1990, Islamic Jihad: An Historical Perspective is her only non-fiction title. She is also featured in a book about female American converts to Islam, Daughters of Another Path. Kolocotronis' first Islamic fiction novel, Innocent People, was written after the September 11 attacks as a reaction to the proliferation of misinformation about Muslims in America. The themes of the book include anti-Muslim actions and sentiments targeted at the characters, as well as the emotional turmoil felt by individual Muslims who were being associated with the acts of the terrorist. Her subsequent novels explore other challenges routinely faced by Muslims in America, especially converts to Islam. Kolocotronis’ Echoes Series is the second series of Islamic fiction novels to be written in English.

Publications

Books
 Islamic Jihad: An Historical Perspective (American Trust Publications, 1990)  
 Innocent People (Leathers Publishing, 2003, paperback)  
 Echoes (Muslims Writers Publishing, 2006, paperback)  
 Rebounding (Muslim Writers Publishing, 2006, paperback)  
 Turbulence (Muslim Writers Publishing, 2007, paperback)  
 Ripples (Muslim Writers Publishing, 2008, paperback)  
 Silence (Muslim Writers Publishing, 2009, paperback)

References

External links
 Jamilah Kolocotronis Books
 Jamilah Kolocotronis @ The Islamic Writers Alliance

1956 births
Truman State University alumni
American Muslims
Converts to Islam
20th-century Muslim scholars of Islam
American religious writers
Women religious writers
Islamic fiction writers
Living people
American writers of Greek descent